is the 15th major single by the Japanese idol group Cute and their first single of 2011, released on February 23, 2011.

Track listing

CD single

Single V

Event V 
Catalog Nr.: TGBS-5753

Charts

References

External links 
 Profile on the Hello! Project official website
 Profile on the Up-Front Works official website
 Event V on the Hello! Project official website
 Kiss me 愛してる 千聖 C-ute's official blog

2011 singles
Japanese-language songs
Cute (Japanese idol group) songs
Songs written by Tsunku
Song recordings produced by Tsunku
Zetima Records singles
Japanese synth-pop songs
Torch songs
Songs about kissing